Luzar or Lužar is a surname. Notable people with this name include:
Alenka Luzar (died 2019), Slovenian-American chemist
Chris Luzar (born 1979), American football player
 (born 1964), Czech member of parliament
 (1972–2017), Slovenian track and field athlete, silver medalist at 1990 World Junior Championships

See also
Luzar, fictional character in manga and anime series Papuwa